Stefan Eeckelaert (3 July 1964 – 8 January 2019) was a Belgian professional darts player.

Career

Eeckelaert won the 1988 Dortmund Open, the 1990 French Open and the 1991 Antwerp Open. He made his major debut in the 1993 Winmau World Masters, losing in the first round to Ray Farrell. Eeckelaert then went on to win the Belgium National Championship and the Belgium Gold Cup in 1994 and also reached the final of the Norway Open and the Belgium Open, losing to Mike Gregory in both finals. He returned to the World Masters the same year, but suffered a second first round exit in a defeat to Roland Scholten.

Eeckelaert then made his only appearance in the BDO World Darts Championship in 1995, losing in the first round 3–0 to Peter Hunt. He then played in the 1995 World Masters, beating Alan Brown in the first round before losing to Richie Burnett. He reached the quarter finals of the 1996 Norway Open before fading away from the scene.

Eeckelaert died on 8 January 2019.

World Championship performances

BDO
1995: 1st Round (lost to Peter Hunt 0–3)

External links
Profile and stats on Darts Database

Belgian darts players
1964 births
2019 deaths
British Darts Organisation players
Sportspeople from Antwerp